Taghi Sayyid Khamoushi was an Iranian bazaari merchant and conservative politician.

References 

1937 births
2006 deaths
Islamic Coalition Party politicians
Islamic Republican Party politicians
20th-century Iranian businesspeople
Members of the 1st Islamic Consultative Assembly